Squadra Scappatella was a professional continental cycling team based in Austria and participated in professional cycling team, which competed in elite road bicycle racing events such as the UCI Women's Road World Cup.

In preparation for the 2009 season, the team merged with fellow Austrian squad: Team Uniqa.

Major wins
2005
Stage 2 Tour de Feminin – Krásná Lípa, Andrea Graus	

2011
Stage 5 Tour de Feminin – O cenu Českého Švýcarska, Romy Kasper

National champions
2005
 Austria Road Race, Andrea Graus

2007
 Czech Road Race, Martina Růžičková
 Slovakia Time Trial, Katarína Uhláriková

2008
 Czech Road Race, Martina Růžičková
 Slovakia Time Trial, Katarína Uhláriková

2009
 Luxembourg Road Race, Nathalie Lamborelle
 Czech Road Race, Martina Růžičková

2013
 Hungary Time Trial, Mónika Király

Rosters

2008

Ages as of 1 January 2008.

2013

Ages as of 1 January 2013.

References

External links
 Official Site 

Defunct cycling teams
Cycling teams based in Austria
Cycling teams disestablished in 2013
Cycling teams established in 2008